Hans Jorge Mulder (born 27 April 1987) is a Dutch professional footballer who plays for Eredivisie club RKC Waalwijk.

Born to a Spanish mother and a Dutch father, Mulder has had a journeyman career and played for clubs in his native Netherlands, Spain, Denmark and India. He is most noted for his two stints at RKC Waalwijk, for whom he has made more than 200 appearances.

Career

Early years
Born in Amsterdam to a Spanish mother and a Dutch father, Mulder played in the youth departments of Zeeburgia and Spanish club Zaragoza, before joining the academy of RKC Waalwijk in 2004. In the winter break of the 2006–07 season, Mulder was promoted to the RKC first team. In total he made 125 appearances for the club. At the start of the 2011–12 season, he was signed by Willem II on a free transfer. He left this club again on a free transfer at the end of the 2012–13 season. In November 2013, Mulder signed a two-year contract with NEC. With the Nijmegen club, he suffered relegation from the Eredivisie in the 2013–14 season. Due to a relegation clause in his contract, his deal was terminated in June 2014.

Journeyman years
On 8 September 2014, he signed for Indian club Delhi Dynamos FC, where he joined a team which included Italian star Alessandro Del Piero. He made his debut for the club on 14 October 2014 in a match against FC Pune City where he played the full 90 minutes. Mulder signed a six-month contract with Danish Superliga club FC Nordsjælland in January 2015. They had signed him on a free transfer after his contract with Delhi Dynamos expired. He returned to Delhi Dynamos for his second season in the Indian Super League afterwards, making it to the semi-finals under player-coach Roberto Carlos. On 9 March 2016, he signed for the remainder of the 2015–16 season with Spanish Segunda División B club Cacereño. For the 2016 season of the Indian Super League, Mulder returned to play for Chennaiyin FC. In the beginning of 2017, Mulder moved to CD Eldense in the Segunda División B. On 3 April, the club withdrew the already virtually relegated team from the competition after an embarrassing 12–0 defeat to FC Barcelona B. The club turned around on the decision the following day, but at that point complaints of match fixing at Eldense had already been made, and as a result Mulder left the club.

Return to RKC Waalwijk
In August 2017, Mulder reported to Mark Luijpers, the assistant coach of VVV-Venlo with whom he previously worked at Delhi Dynamos, for a trial period with the Eredivisie side. On 3 October, Mulder signed a one-year contract with RKC Waalwijk. In 2019, he reached promotion to the Eredivisie with RKC after promotion play-offs. Mulder subsequently signed a one-year contract extension with the club.

Career statistics

Honours
RKC Waalwijk:
Eerste Divisie: 2010–11

References

External links
 
 

1987 births
Living people
Footballers from Amsterdam
Dutch footballers
Dutch people of Spanish descent
Association football midfielders
Eredivisie players
Eerste Divisie players
Danish Superliga players
RKC Waalwijk players
NEC Nijmegen players
Willem II (football club) players
A.V.V. Zeeburgia players
Real Zaragoza players
FC Nordsjælland players
Odisha FC players
Chennaiyin FC players
Indian Super League players
Segunda División B players
CP Cacereño players
CD Eldense footballers
Dutch expatriate footballers
Dutch expatriate sportspeople in India
Dutch expatriate sportspeople in Denmark
Expatriate footballers in India
Expatriate men's footballers in Denmark